Alfons Goppel (1 October 1905 – 24 December 1991) was a German politician of the CSU party and Prime Minister of Bavaria (1962–1978).

Biography
Alfons Goppel was born in Reinhausen (now Regensburg), one of the nine children of the baker Ludwig Goppel and his wife Barbara.

He married Gertrud Wittenbrink in 1935 and they had six sons.

Goppel studied law in Munich from 1925 to 1929 and, after graduating, moved back to Regensburg, where he became a lawyer. He joined the state prosecutors office in 1934 and was posted to Mainburg, Kaiserslautern and finally Aschaffenburg. He joined the conservative Bavarian People's Party in 1930 and was a member until the party's self-dissolution in November 1933. He joined the SA (1933) and the NSDAP (1937) in the following years.

He took part in the campaigns in France and Russia in the German Wehrmacht during the Second World War and later became an instructor at the Infanterieschule Döberitz, near Berlin, a training camp of the German army.

Returning from the war, he became an official at the city of Aschaffenburg, responsible for housing and refugees. He was elected to the Bavarian Landtag in October 1947 but barred from taking up his seat due to his political past. He, unsuccessfully, campaigned for the Landtag in 1950 again, became second mayor of Aschaffenburg in 1952 and finally, in 1954, was elected to the Landtag and permitted to take up his seat. He remained in the Bavarian parliament until 1978, when he gave it up to become a member of the European Parliament.

He unsuccessfully ran for mayor of Würzburg in 1956 and became an under secretary in the Bavarian Ministry of Justice the year after. He was Bavarian Minister of the Interior (1958–1962) and prime minister of Bavaria from 11 December 1962 to 7 November 1978, serving as President of the Bundesrat in 1972/73. In 1974 he gained the highest election victory for the CSU in Bavarian history with 62.1% of the votes.

From 1979 to 1984 he was a member of the European Parliament, as such being part of the first freely elected group of MPs in 1979. He died, aged 86, in Johannesberg, near Aschaffenburg.

One of his sons, Thomas Goppel, later served amongst others as Minister of Science, Research and the Arts (2003–2008).

The Alfons-Goppel-Stiftung (Alfons Goppel Foundation), formed in 1980 and named after him, supports needy children in third-world countries.

Honors
 Honorary doctorate of the University of Würzburg and the St. John's University Minnesota.

References

External links

 Alfons-Goppel-Stiftung, official website (in German)
 Official Bavarian government website -  Alfons Goppel biography (in German)

1905 births
1991 deaths
Sturmabteilung personnel
People from Regensburg
People from the Kingdom of Bavaria
Presidents of the German Bundesrat
Ministers-President of Bavaria
Ministers of the Bavaria State Government
Members of the Landtag of Bavaria
Grand Crosses 1st class of the Order of Merit of the Federal Republic of Germany
Recipients of the Order of Merit of Baden-Württemberg
Burials at Munich Waldfriedhof